"Good News" is a song by American musician Mac Miller from his sixth studio album, Circles (2020). The song was written and produced by Miller and Jon Brion, and was released posthumously on January 9, 2020, as the lead single from the album. It peaked at number 17 on the US Billboard Hot 100, becoming Miller's highest-charting single as a lead artist.

Composition 
XXL describes the song as "tranquil" and having "some peaceful instrumentation and some sullen singing from Miller."

Reception 
Alphonse Pierre of Pitchfork described the song as having "a quiet optimism that pierces through the darkness." Pierre noted its similarities to Swimming: "'Good News' evokes the sound of a live band at a beach resort: sleepy guitars, slow drums, and weary singing."

Accolades

Personnel 

 Mac Miller – lead vocals, songwriting, production
 Jon Brion – songwriting, production, guitar, keyboards
 Wendy Melvoin – bass, guitar
 Matt Chamberlain – drums
 Vic Wainstein – associate producer, recording
 Eric Caudieux – recording
 Greg Koller – recording
 Rouble Kapoor – recording assistant
 Greg Koller – mixing
 Patricia Sullivan – mastering

Charts

Certifications

References 

2020 singles
2020 songs
Mac Miller songs
Songs written by Mac Miller
Songs written by Jon Brion
Song recordings produced by Jon Brion
Warner Records singles